The 2012 Sun Belt Conference baseball tournament was held at Bowling Green Ballpark in Bowling Green, KY from May 23 to May 27, 2012.  The tournament continued the round robin format from the previous season.  Fifth seeded  won their first tournament championship and earned the Sun Belt Conference's automatic bid to the 2012 NCAA Division I baseball tournament.

Seeding and format
The top eight teams (based on conference results) from the conference earn invites to the tournament.  Teams were divided into two four-team pods for round-robin play.  The teams with the best record in each pod then met in a championship game.  If multiple teams shared the best record, head-to-head matchups were used as the first tiebreaker.

Results

All-Tournament Team
The following players were named to the All-Tournament Team.

Most Outstanding Player
Wil Browning was named Most Outstanding Player.  Browning was a pitcher for Louisiana–Monroe.

References

Tournament
Sun Belt Conference Baseball Tournament
Sun Belt Conference baseball tournament
Sun Belt Conference baseball tournament